The European Team Championship (often abbreviated in texts and games databases as ETC) is an international team chess event, eligible for the participation of European nations whose chess federations are located in zones 1.1 to 1.9. This more or less accords with the wider definition of Europe used in other events such as the Eurovision Song Contest and includes Israel, Russia and the former Soviet States. The competition is run under the auspices of the European Chess Union (ECU).

Championship history
The idea was conceived in the early 1950s, when chess organisers became aware of the need for another international team event. Consequently, a men-only Championship was devised and held every four years, with the intention of filling in the gaps between Olympiads. More recently, the Championship has grown in importance and popularity and is regarded as a prestigious tournament in its own right, providing for male and female participants.

The first Championship Final was held in Vienna and Baden bei Wien in 1957 (August 22–28). It was a double round robin and notable for the surprise victory of the Yugoslav team over the mighty Soviet team in their second encounter.

For the next twenty years, Championships occurred at four-year intervals, although the Kapfenberg event was delayed by a year. Since 1977, successive tournaments have mainly been held on a three and then a two-year cycle. A Women's Championship, following the same cycle and venues as the men's, was established at Debrecen in 1992.

Championship format

Over the early years, the formula altered incrementally, to allow the participation of a growing number of teams. At the inaugural event, only four places were made available for the Finals and some teams expected to do well, simply failed to qualify from the preliminary rounds. By 1973, the competition had expanded to roughly double the size and there were twenty-four nations in the preliminaries, competing for eight places in the Finals, held in Bath. Conversely, over the same period, the number of boards played in a match was reduced from ten to eight, presumably to reduce costs for organisers and participatory federations.

Into the new millennium, the format has changed radically and is now based on a Swiss system in nine rounds, on the model of the Olympiad, with one section for the men's teams and one section for the women's teams, considered as separate competitions.  At Gothenburg in 2005, the men's competition comprised 40 teams (including Sweden B and Sweden C) and the women's competition, 26 teams (including Sweden B). Each round was contested over four boards and squads included a reserve.

Historically, teams played for the pleasure of winning the Europa Cup, but nowadays this has been overshadowed by the popular medal-winning format of the 'Olympics' and Chess Olympiad. Gold, silver and bronze medals are awarded to the top three teams and also as board prizes for outstanding individual performances.

Plovdiv 2003 heralded a major change in the scoring methodology. Both the men's and women's events were, for the first time, scored by total of match points, rather than game points as had previously been the case. Game points are still recorded for purposes of tie-breaking.

Summary of results

Open section

Women section

Total team ranking

Open section
The table contains the men's teams ranked by the medals won at the European Team Championship.

Women section
The table contains the women's teams ranked by the medals won at the European Team Championship.

See also

Chess Olympiad
Women's Chess Olympiad
World Team Chess Championship
Chess at the African Games
Pan American Team Chess Championship
Asian Team Chess Championship
Russia (USSR) vs Rest of the World
European Chess Club Cup
Correspondence Chess Olympiad

References

Olimpbase - Olympiads and other Team event information
Rules of ETC - FIDE Handbook

External links
2017 Championship
Videostream: 2015 European Team Chess Championship
2015 Championship, Reykjavík, Iceland 
2013 Championship, Warsaw, Poland
2011 Championship, Porto Carras, Greece
2009 Championship, Novi Sad, Serbia
2007 Championship, Crete, Greece
2005 Championship, Goteborg, Sweden
2003 Championship, Plovdiv - and link to historical ETC games archive

Supranational chess championships
Women's chess competitions
1957 in chess
Recurring sporting events established in 1957
Chess in Europe